Scythris minima is a moth of the family Scythrididae. It was described by Bengt Å. Bengtsson in 1997. It is found in Spain.

References

minima
Moths described in 1997